Andreas Hajek (born 16 April 1968 in Weißenfels) is a retired German rower.

At the 1986 World Rowing Championships, he replaced a sick Thomas Lange at short notice when he was only 18; he won a bronze medal at that occasion. Hajek was the youngest East German team member that year. During his career Hajek became a two-time Olympic champion and five-time world champion.

References

Rowers at the 1992 Summer Olympics
Rowers at the 1996 Summer Olympics
Rowers at the 2000 Summer Olympics
Rowers at the 2004 Summer Olympics
Olympic rowers of Germany
Olympic gold medalists for Germany
Olympic bronze medalists for Germany
1968 births
Living people
Olympic medalists in rowing
German male rowers
Medalists at the 2000 Summer Olympics
Medalists at the 1996 Summer Olympics
Medalists at the 1992 Summer Olympics
World Rowing Championships medalists for East Germany
World Rowing Championships medalists for Germany
People from Weißenfels
Sportspeople from Saxony-Anhalt